

Films

References

Films
LGBT
2003
2003-related lists